The 1924–25 season was the 52nd season of competitive football in Scotland and the 35th season of the Scottish Football League.

Scottish League Division One 

Champions: Rangers
Relegated: Ayr United, Third Lanark

Scottish League Division Two 

Promoted: Dundee United, Clydebank 
Relegated: Johnstone, Forfar Athletic

Scottish League Division Three 

Promoted: Nithsdale Wanderers, Queen of the South

NOTE: Leith replace Dumbarton Harp who withdrew, 
fixtures expunged, Brechin awarded 2 pts when 
Dykehead failed to play return match.

Scottish Cup 

Celtic were winners of the Scottish Cup after a 2–1 win over Dundee.

Other honours

National

County 

. * aggregate over two legs

Highland League

Junior Cup 
Saltcoats Victoria were winners of the Junior Cup after a 2–1 win over St Anthony's in the final.

Scotland national team 

Scotland was winner of the 1924–25 British Home Championship.

Key:
 (H) = Home match
 (A) = Away match
 BHC = British Home Championship

Notes and references

External links 
 Scottish Football Historical Archive

 
Seasons in Scottish football